Miss Vietnam 2022 was the 18th edition of the Miss Vietnam pageant. It was held on 23 December 2022 at Phu Tho Indoor Stadium, Ho Chi Minh City, Vietnam. Miss Vietnam 2020 Đỗ Thị Hà crowned her successor Huỳnh Thị Thanh Thủy at the end of the event.

Results

Placements
Color keys

§ - People's Choice winner

Special awards

Fast Track Events

Beauty With A Purpose
The winner of Beauty With A Purpose would automatically advance to Top 5

Beach Beauty

Multimedia

Top Model

Talent

Sports

Contestants
35 contestants in the final

Judges
The Miss Vietnam 2022 final judges were:

 Lê Xuân Sơn - Editor-in-chief of Tien Phong newspaper
 Trần Hữu Việt - Member of Executive Committee and Head of Young Writers' Committee of Vietnam Writers Association, Head of Culture and Arts Department of Nhan Dan newspaper
 Nguyễn Xuân Bắc - Actor, Director of Vietnam Drama Theater
 Lê Thanh Hòa - Fashion designer and stylist
 Nguyễn Thụy Vân - 2nd Runner-up of Miss Vietnam 2008
 Trần Tiểu Vy - Miss Vietnam 2018
 Lê Nguyễn Bảo Ngọc - Miss Intercontinental 2022.

References

2022 beauty pageants
Beauty pageants in Vietnam
Vietnamese awards